Hyperolius parkeri is a species of frog in the family Hyperoliidae.
It is found in Kenya, Mozambique, and Tanzania.
Its natural habitats are subtropical or tropical dry forests, moist savanna, rivers, swamps, rural gardens, and heavily degraded former forest.

References

parkeri
Amphibians described in 1933
Taxonomy articles created by Polbot